Suchomel  (with its female form Suchomelová) is a Czech surname that is also present in the Czech diaspora.
Notable people with the name Suchomel/Suchomelová include:
 (born 1966), Czech japanologist, art historian and educator
Franz Suchomel (1907–1979), Sudeten German Nazi war criminal
 (1883−1957), Austrian lawyer and ministerial official
 (born 1930), Czech anti-Communist resistance activist
 (born 1950), Czech writer
 (1976–2008), Czech bodybuilder

References

Czech-language surnames
Occupational surnames